Wurzen railway station is a railway station in Wurzen, Saxony, Germany. The station is located on the Leipzig–Dresden line and operated by DB Station&Service.

Services

Railway services 
As of March 2017, DB Regio and S-Bahn Mitteldeutschland services call at the station.

RE 50 operates hourly, S4 every 30 minutes.

Local transport 
City bus lines A and B as well as many regional bus lines frequently stop at this station. The bus station is located near the railway station.

References

External links 
 

Railway stations in Saxony
railway station